The Saigon BRT (Vietnamese: Xe buýt nhanh Thành phố Hồ Chí Minh) is a planned bus rapid transit system in Ho Chi Minh City, Vietnam. Scheduled to open in 2022, the BRT's No. 1 route will operate using electric buses from District 1 to Binh Chanh District.

References 
Rapid transit in Vietnam
Public transport in Ho Chi Minh City
Transport in Ho Chi Minh City